Hajder is a Slavic surname. Notable people with the surname include:

 Ensar Hajder (born 1991), Bosnian swimmer
 Joško Hajder (1994–2022), Croatian footballer

See also
 Haider

Slavic-language surnames